William Ward Jr. (July 7, 1865 – March 6, 1949) was an American politician from Pennsylvania who served as a Republican member of the Pennsylvania House of Representatives for Delaware County for the 1909 and 1911 terms.  He also served as mayor of Chester, Pennsylvania from 1911 to 1915 and again from 1932 to 1939. He is the son of U.S. Congressman William Ward.

Early life and education
Ward was born in Chester, Pennsylvania to William and Clara (Ulrich) Ward and graduated from Chester High School in 1883.

Ward worked as a real estate broker and in the fire insurance business.

Career
Ward was elected to the Chester City Council.

Ward was elected controller for the City of Chester from 1905 to 1911.  He was elected as a member of the House of Representatives for Delaware County for the 1909 and 1911 terms.  Ward resigned from the House on November 28, 1911.

Ward served as mayor of Chester, Pennsylvania from 1911 to 1915 and for a second term from 1932 to 1939.

Ward served as the clerk to the Pennsylvania House of Representatives from 1939 to 1940.

Ward also served as prothonotary for the Courts of Delaware County.

Personal life

Ward was married to Rosa (Mackinson) Ward.  He is interred at the Chester Rural Cemetery in Chester, Pennsylvania.

See also
List of mayors of Chester, Pennsylvania

References

|-

|-

1865 births
1949 deaths
20th-century American politicians
Burials at Chester Rural Cemetery
Chester High School alumni
Mayors of Chester, Pennsylvania
Republican Party members of the Pennsylvania House of Representatives
Pennsylvania city council members
Pennsylvania prothonotaries